The 2020 NCAA Division I Softball season, play of college softball in the United States organized by the National Collegiate Athletic Association (NCAA) at the Division I level, began February 6, 2020. The season ended on March 12, 2020, when the NCAA cancelled all winter championships and spring sports seasons due to the coronavirus pandemic. The 2020 NCAA Division I softball tournament and 2020 Women's College World Series, which were to be held in Oklahoma City, Oklahoma at ASA Hall of Fame Stadium, did not occur.

Coronavirus impact and cancellation
As of March 12, 2020, the NCAA cancelled both the remainder of the season and the tournament due to the coronavirus pandemic.

As of 2021, all Division I softball players were given another year of eligibility due to the restraints and cancellations from the coronavirus pandemic. Each player is given the option to use their extra year of eligibility or not.

Ballpark changes
 The 2020 season was the first for Virginia at Palmer Park, replacing The Park. The team played its first game there on March 3 against James Madison.
 The 2020 season was the first for Clemson at Clemson Softball Stadium, and its first season altogether.

Season outlook

Conference standings
Note: Records as of cancellation of season on March 12, 2020.

Coaching changes
This table lists programs that changed head coaches at any point from the first day of the 2020 season until the day before the first day of the 2021 season.

See also
2020 NCAA Division I baseball season

References